The 2005 FIVB Volleyball World League was the 16th edition of the annual men's international volleyball tournament, played by 12 countries from 27 May to 10 July 2005. The Final Round was held in Belgrade, Serbia and Montenegro.

Pools composition

Intercontinental round
The Final Round hosts Serbia and Montenegro, the winners of each pool and a wild card chosen by the FIVB will qualify for the Final Round. If Serbia and Montenegro are ranked first in Pool C, the team ranked second of Pool C will qualify for the Final Round.

Pool A

|}

|}

Pool B

|}

|}

Pool C

|}

|}

Final round
Venue:  Belgrade Arena, Belgrade, Serbia and Montenegro
All times are Central European Summer Time (UTC+02:00).

First final round

|}

Final four

Semifinals

|}

3rd place match

|}

Final

|}

Final standing

Awards

Most Valuable Player
  Ivan Miljkovic
Best Scorer
  Ivan Miljkovic
Best Spiker
  Henry Bell Cisnero
Best Blocker
  Dante Amaral

Best Server
  Ivan Miljkovic
Best Setter
  Yoandry Diaz
Best Libero
  Marko Samardzić

References

External links
Official website

FIVB Volleyball World League
FIVB World League
Volleyball
Volleyball